The Novia University of Applied Sciences is an institution of higher professional education (vocational university) in Finland. It offers Bachelor's and Master's degree programmes in Swedish in Vaasa, Turku, Raseborg and Jakobstad.

The university was formed on August 1, 2008, by the merging of the Sydväst Polytechnic and the Swedish Polytechnic.

English Programmes

As of 2022, these programmes are conducted in English

Health and Welfare

Bachelor of Health Care, Nursing, 210 ECTS/3,5 years, full-time studies, Vaasa
Bachelor of Beauty and Cosmetics, Beauty Care, 210 ECTS/3,5 years, full-time studies, Vaasa No admission 2022

Technology and Seafaring

Bachelor of Maritime Management, Maritime Management, Captain 270 ECTS/4,5 years, full-time studies, Turku
Bachelor of Maritime Management, Maritime Management, Captain, 270 ECTS/4,5 years, part-time studies, Turku
Bachelor of Engineering, Maritime Technology, 270 ECTS/4,5 years, full-time studies, Turku  
Bachelor of Engineering, Energy Technology, 240 ECTS/2 years, Vaasa New 2022, Notice! Eligibility criteria: 120 ECTS of previous university level studies in a relevant field.

Culture 
Bachelor of  Culture and Arts, Fine Arts, 240 ECTS/4 years, part-time studies, Pietarsaari, low-residency No admission 2022

Bioeconomy 
Bachelor of Natural Resources, Sustainable Coastal Management, 240 ECTS/2 years, full-time studies, Raasepori 
Notice! Eligibility criteria: 120 ECTS of previous university level studies in a relevant field.

Business 
Master of Business Administration, Digital Business and Management, 90 ECTS, Vaasa
Master of Business Administration, Service Design, 90 ECTS, Turku

Health and Welfare 
Master of Health Care/Master of Social Services, Health Care and Social Services, 90 ECTS, Online studies

Technology and Seafaring
Master of Engineering, Automation Technology, intelligent systems,60 ECTS,  Vaasa
Master of Engineering, Industrial Management and Engineering, 60 ECTS, Vaasa 
Master of Engineering, Structural Engineering, 60 ECTS, Raasepori New 2022
Master of Engineering/Master of Maritime Management, Maritime Management, 60 ECTS, Turku 
Master of Engineering, Autonomous Maritime Operations, 60 ECTS, Turku 

Bioeconomy
Master of Natural Resources, Natural Resources Management, 60 ECTS, Online studies

Swedish Bachelor Programmes

 Technology and Seafaring
 Health and Welfare
 Business
 Natural Resources
 Arts and Humanities

Student Unions

The university has a proud tradition of student unions, and student union events are regularly held throughout the academic year.

 EKA - The Student Union for Novia UAS Raseborg campus
 ENÅ - The Studien Union for maritime students at Novia UAS Aboa Mare campus in Turku
 Filicia r.f. - The Student Union for all Engineering students at Novia UAS Vaasa campus
 MASK - The Student Union for Culture and Arts
 N.U.D - The Student Union for Nurses at Novia UAS Vaasa campus
 ÅKA - The Student Union at Novia UAS Turku campus 
 SYH-FIILIS - an organisation for alumni of Novia UAS

References

External links
The homepage of the institution

Education in Ostrobothnia (region)
Vaasa
Nursing schools in Finland
Education in Uusimaa
Organisations based in Raseborg
2008 establishments in Finland